Julio José Iglesias de la Cueva (born 23 September 1943) is a Spanish singer, songwriter and former professional footballer. Iglesias is recognized as the most commercially successful Spanish singer in the world and one of the top record sellers in music history, having sold more than 100 million records worldwide in 14 languages. It is estimated that during his career he has performed in more than 5000 concerts, for over 60 million people in five continents. In April 2013, Iglesias was inducted into the Latin Songwriters Hall of Fame.

In 1983, Iglesias was celebrated as having recorded songs in the most languages in the world, and in 2013 for being the artist in Latin music with the most records sold in history. In April 2013 in Beijing, he was honoured as the most popular international artist in China. In Brazil, France, Italy and elsewhere, Iglesias is the most successful foreign record seller, while in his home country, Spain, he has sold the most records in history, with 23 million records.

During his career, Iglesias has won many awards in the music industry, including the Grammy, Latin Grammy, World Music Award, Billboard Music Award, American Music Award and Lo Nuestro Award. He has been awarded the Gold Medal for Merit in the Fine Arts of Spain and the Legion of Honour of France. UNICEF named him Special Ambassador for the Performing Arts in 1989. He has had a star on the Hollywood Walk of Fame since 1985.

Early life
Iglesias was born in Madrid to Julio Iglesias Sr., a medical doctor from Ourense who became one of the youngest gynecologists in the country, and María del Rosario de la Cueva y Perignat. His paternal grandparents, Manuela Puga Noguerol and Ulpiano Iglesias Sarria, were of Galician ancestry. His maternal grandparents were José de la Cueva y Orejuela (1887–1955) and Dolores de Perignat y Ruiz de Benavides, who was a native of Guayama, Puerto Rico.

The name "Iglesias" translates as "churches". Iglesias says that he is of Jewish ancestry on his maternal side, and that his mother's family name, "de la Cueva", meaning literally "of the cave" and referring to Jewish people in hiding, is a common Jewish name. He has proclaimed himself Jewish "from the waist up".

He alternated playing professional football with studying law at the CEU San Pablo University in Madrid. In his youth, he was a goalkeeper for Real Madrid Castilla in the Segunda División. His professional football career was ruined when he was involved in a serious automobile accident in 1963 that left him unable to walk for two years. The accident smashed his lower spine and left his legs permanently weakened and requiring therapy for several years. He has said of those years, "I had more courage and attitude than talent". While he was in hospital after the accident, a nurse named Eladio Magdaleno gave him a guitar so that he could recover the dexterity of his hands. In learning to play, he discovered his musical talent. After his rehabilitation, Iglesias studied for three months at Bell Educational Trust's Language School in Cambridge, England. After that, he returned to obtain his law degree at Complutense University of Madrid.

Entertainment career

In 1968, he won the Benidorm International Song Festival, a songwriter's event in Spain, with the song "La vida sigue igual" (meaning "Life Goes On The Same") which was used in the film La vida sigue igual about his own life. He then signed a deal with Discos Columbia, the Spanish branch of the Columbia Records company, and released his first studio album, titled Yo Canto, or I Sing. The album spent 15 weeks in the Spanish charts
and peaked at No. 3. He represented Spain in the 1970 Eurovision Song Contest, finishing in fourth place behind Ireland's winning entry, performed by Dana. His entry was the song "Gwendolyne." Shortly after, he had a number one hit in many European countries with "Un Canto A Galicia", sung in Galician, in honour of his father, who hailed from Galicia. That single sold 1 million copies in Germany. In 1975, he found success in the Italian market by recording a song exclusively in Italian, called "Se mi lasci non vale" or "If You Leave Me, It Can't Be." Notable albums from this decade are A flor de piel (1974, with the European hit "Manuela"), El amor (1975), and Soy (1973). He also sang in French: one of his popular songs in this language became "Je n'ai pas changé."

In 1979, he moved to Miami, Florida, in the United States, signed a deal with CBS International and started singing in different languages such as French, Italian, Portuguese and German. Two years later, he released the album De niña a mujer in five languages, which he dedicated to his daughter, who appeared on the cover with him. From it came the first English-language hit of his career, a cover of "Begin the Beguine" which became number 1 in the United Kingdom; he also released a collection, Julio (1983).

In 1984, he released 1100 Bel Air Place, the hit album which established him as a star in the English-speaking entertainment industry. It sold over three million albums in the United States alone. The first single, "To All the Girls I've Loved Before", a duet with Willie Nelson, hit No. 1 on the Country charts and went Top Five in the Billboard Hot 100. It also featured "All of You", in vocal duet with Diana Ross, a Top Twenty Pop hit, that climbed to No. 2 on the Adult Contemporary Chart with the help of a popular video. He also performs duets with The Beach Boys for those years.

Iglesias won a Grammy Award for Best Latin Pop Album in the 1988 Grammy Awards for the album Un hombre solo ("A Man Alone"). In that year, he recorded a duet with Stevie Wonder, "My Love", in his Non Stop album, a crossover success in 1988.

Iglesias made a cameo appearance as himself on The Golden Girls as Sophia Petrillo's date on St. Valentine's Day 1989.

In 1993, recorded Summer Wind with Frank Sinatra.

In 1994, released Crazy, including duets with Dolly Parton, Sting and Art Garfunkel.

In 1995, Iglesias was the recipient of the Excellence Award at the 1995 Lo Nuestro Awards. In 2001, Iglesias was recognized as the Person of the Year by the Latin Recording Academy. A year later, Iglesias was inducted into the International Latin Music Hall of Fame.

In 2003, Iglesias released his album Divorcio ("Divorce"). In its first day of sales, Divorcio sold a record 350,000 albums in Spain, and reached the number 1 spot on the charts in Spain, Portugal, France, Italy, and Russia. In 2003 and 2004, aided by the success of his Divorcio album, Iglesias went on a ten-month world tour which took him from Europe to Asia and then on to North America, South America and Africa. More than half the shows on that tour sold out within days of going on sale. In December 2004, his Dutch girlfriend Miranda Rijnsburger and Iglesias himself recorded a duet of the Christmas song "Silent Night". The song, which was not officially released, also included a voice message from Iglesias, Rijnsburger, and their four young children. The song was released online through the singer's official website and a CD was included on their Christmas card as a holiday gift from the Iglesias family to their friends and fans around the world.

In 2008, Iglesias recorded another song as a gift to his fans. The family recorded "The Little Drummer Boy" in Spanish and English and included it in the family's Christmas card. Iglesias also made investments in the Dominican Republic's eastern town of Punta Cana, a major tourist destination, where he took to spending most of the year. He became a Dominican citizen in 2005.

In September 2006, Iglesias released a new English-language album, which he titled Romantic Classics. "I've chosen songs from the 1960s, 1970s and 1980s that I believe will come to be regarded as the new standards," Iglesias stated in the album's sleeve notes. The album featured his interpretations of Foreigner's "I Want to Know What Love Is", the Wham! selection "Careless Whisper", and Richard Marx's "Right Here Waiting". Romantic Classics was Iglesias's highest debut on the Billboard charts, entering at number 31 in the United States, 21 in Canada, 10 in Australia, and top spots across Europe and Asia. He returned to the studio to record songs in Filipino and Indonesian for his Asian releases of Romantic Classics, which helped propel record sales in the Asian entertainment industry. Iglesias promoted Romantic Classics in 2006; it was seen all over the world on television shows. In the United States, for example, he appeared on Dancing With The Stars, where he sang his version of "I Want To Know What Love Is", Good Morning America, The View, Fox and Friends and Martha Stewart.

In 2008, Iglesias made a music video with Gulnara Karimova, the daughter of Uzbek dictator Islam Karimov. In October 2012, he performed a concert in Equatorial Guinea where tickets were reportedly $1,000 each.

Iglesias's performance of the song "La Mer" ("The Sea") is featured in the soundtrack of the 2011 film Tinker Tailor Soldier Spy. The performance comes from a live album that he recorded live at the Olympia in 1976.

On 1 April 2013, in Beijing, he received two historic awards: First & Most Popular International Artist of All Time in China, an award given by Sony Music China and which was presented to Iglesias by the world-renowned Chinese artist Lang Lang, and the Guinness World Records for the Best-selling Male Latin Artist. As Iglesias is a composer and lyricist, some of his songs being of his own authorship and composition, on 23 April 2013, he was inducted into the Latin Songwriters Hall of Fame, alongside Armando Manzanero and José Feliciano.

In 2015, Iglesias was slated to perform a complete concert for the first time with his son Julio Iglesias Jr. in a tour in Romania, on 22 May at Sala Polivalentă in Cluj-Napoca and 2 July at Sala Palatului in the capital city, Bucharest.

Berklee College of Music awarded Iglesias an Honorary Doctorate in May 2015 in recognition of his achievements and influence in music and for his enduring contribution to American and international culture.

Personal life
On 29 January 1971, Iglesias married Isabel Preysler, a Filipina television host. Preysler, a Filipina of Spanish ancestry, was also a member of the wealthy and aristocratic Pérez de Tagle family. The couple had three children: Chábeli (born 3 September 1971), a socialite; Julio Jr. (born 25 February 1973), a singer; and Enrique (born 8 May 1975), an internationally successful singer-songwriter, actor, and record producer. In the 1970s, Iglesias and his family were extensively depicted on the front pages of international newspapers and magazines. The marriage ended in divorce in 1979. The couple also applied for marriage annulment by the Catholic Church which was granted in 1980.

Whenever Iglesias was not on tour, he spent his time at his Miami residence, purchased in 1978 for $650,000. The mansion on the private Indian Creek Island, whose interior design was made by Virginia Sipl, was placed on the market in 2006 for a quoted $28 million, making it one of the "Ten Most Expensive Homes in the South" in 2006 according to Forbes magazine.

After his divorce, Iglesias lived with Dutch model Miranda Rijnsburger, 22 years his junior, whom he married on 26 August 2010 in a small church in Marbella, Spain. They had five children: Miguel Alejandro Iglesias (born 7 September 1997), Rodrigo Iglesias (born 3 April 1999), twins Cristina and Victoria Iglesias (born 1 May 2001), and Guillermo Iglesias (born 5 May 2007). They took up residence in the Dominican Republic, where Iglesias had acquired several hotel complexes, as well as the Punta Cana International Airport, which he acquired jointly with other investors, including fashion designer Oscar de la Renta.

On 19 December 2005, Iglesias's father died of a heart attack at the age of 90. A week before his father's death, it became known that Ronna Keitt, his father's 42-year-old wife, was pregnant with their second child. Their first child, Jaime, had been born on 18 May 2004. The second child, Ruth, was born on 26 July 2006.

In 2008, after his house in Indian Creek did not sell at his asking price, he ordered it razed and said he planned to build another on the lot. In 2012, he purchased the property next door for $15 million and announced that he planned to build a new home on the combined properties. In 2020, he agreed to sell it to Jared Kushner and his wife Ivanka Trump, a daughter of then-U.S. President Donald Trump.

In 2019, a court in Valencia ruled that Iglesias is the father of Javier Sánchez, son of Portuguese former dancer Maria Edite Santos. Sánchez had been pursuing his paternity suit in court since 1992, arguing that he was conceived when his mother allegedly had an affair with Iglesias in the Catalonia region in July 1975. The singer, who rejected all those claims, had refused on several occasions to undergo a paternity test. The Sánchez legal team argued that DNA evidence obtained in the US by an investigator proved their case; however, the DNA sample did not come directly from the singer but was collected from "a bottle of water" used by his son, Julio Iglesias Jr, which he left on a Miami beach. The presiding judge, José Miguel Bort, rejected this DNA claim but ruled in favor of Sánchez. Delivering the verdict, Judge Bort said his decision was reached in part because of the "resemblance between the two men" and on the basis of Edite's testimony. Iglesias appealed the verdict and the Provincial Court of Valencia reversed Judge Bort's ruling, declaring it cannot be proven that Sánchez is the son of Iglesias. The matter was taken to the Supreme Court of the country, and, in April 2021, the Court dismissed the claims made by Sánchez, imposing also the costs of the process on him.

Honours and awards

Honours

Spanish National Honours 

  Gold Medal of Merit in the Fine Arts
  Gold Medal of the Community of Madrid

Foreign Honours 

 
 Knight of the Legion of Honor
 Medal of the City of Paris

Discography

 Selected albums
1969: Yo canto
1970: Gwendolyne
1972: Un canto a Galicia
1973: Soy
1974: A flor de piel
1975: A México
1975: El amor
1976: America
1977: A mis 33 años
1978: Aimer la vie
1978: Emociones
1978: Sono un pirata, sono un signore
1979: À vous les femmes
1980: Hey!
1981: De niña a mujer
1982: Et l'amour crea la femme
1982: Momentos
1982: Momenti
1983: Julio

1984: 1100 Bel Air Place 
1985: Libra
1987: Un hombre solo
1987: Tutto l'amore che ti manca
1988: Non Stop
1989: Raíces
1990: Starry Night
1992: Calor
1994: Crazy 
1995: La carretera
1996: Tango
2000: Noche de cuatro lunas
2001: Ao Meu Brasil
2003: Divorcio
2006: Romantic Classics 
2007: Quelque chose de France
2011: 1
2015: México
2017: México & Amigos 
2017: Dois Corações

Awards and nominations

References

External links
 
 Musicadelrecuerdo.com Musica de Julio Iglesias
 

 
1943 births
20th-century Spanish singers
21st-century Spanish singers
American country singer-songwriters
Association football goalkeepers
Columbia Records artists
Commandeurs of the Légion d'honneur
Country musicians from Florida
Crooners
English-language singers from Spain
Eurovision Song Contest entrants for Spain
Eurovision Song Contest entrants of 1970
French-language singers of Spain
Galician-language singers
German-language singers
Grammy Award winners
Grammy Lifetime Achievement Award winners
Julio
Italian-language singers
Japanese-language singers
Latin music songwriters
Latin pop singers
Latin Recording Academy Person of the Year honorees
Living people
Musicians from Madrid
Musicians from Miami
Naturalized citizens of the Dominican Republic
People named in the Pandora Papers
People named in the Paradise Papers
Portuguese-language singers
Real Madrid Castilla footballers
Russian-language singers
Singers from Florida
Singers from Madrid
Footballers from Madrid
Songwriters from Florida
Sony Music Latin artists
Sony Music Spain artists
Spanish emigrants to the United States
Spanish expatriates in the United States
Spanish footballers
Spanish male singers
Spanish people of Galician descent
Spanish people of Jewish descent
Spanish people of Puerto Rican descent
Spanish pop singers
Spanish songwriters
Tagalog-language singers